Studnice may refer to places:

Czech Republic
Studnice (Chrudim District), a municipality and village in Pardubice Region
Studnice (Náchod District), a municipality and village in Hradec Králové Region
Studnice (Třebíč District), a municipality and village in Vysočina Region
Studnice (Vyškov District), a municipality and village in South Moravian Region
Studnice, a village and part of Lodhéřov in South Bohemian Region
Studnice, a village and part of Nové Město na Moravě in Vysočina Region
Vysoké Studnice, a municipality and village in Vysočina Region

Poland
 Studnice, Poland

See also
 Studnica (disambiguation) (Polish form)